Margarida is a Portuguese female given name, which is a variant of the name Margaret, and which also means "daisy flower" in Portuguese. 

The given name may refer to:
Margarida Cabral de Melo (1570–1631), Portuguese noblewoman
Margarida Cordeiro (born 1939), Portuguese film director 
Margarida Teresa da Silva e Orta (1711–1793), Brazilian author
Margarida de Abreu (1915–2006), Portuguese choreographer
Margarida Marante (1959–2012), Portuguese journalist 
Margarida Moura (born 1993), Portuguese tennis player
Margarida Penha-Lopes (born 1964), Portuguese Historical Sciences professor
Margarida Vila-Nova (born 1983), Portuguese actress
Margarida Xirgu (1888–1969), Spanish actress
Margarida Zelle (1876–1917), Dutch dancer and spy known as Mata Hari
Jorge José Emiliano dos Santos (1954–1995), Brazilian football referee known as Margarida
Clésio Moreira dos Santos (born 1958), Brazilian football referee known as Margarida

References

Given names derived from gemstones
Portuguese feminine given names